Three Desperate Men is a 1951 American Western film directed by Sam Newfield and starring Preston Foster, Jim Davis and Virginia Grey. It co-stars Kim Spalding, William Haade, Monte Blue and Sid Melton.

Plot

Cast
Preston Foster as Tom Denton
Jim Davis as Fred Denton
Virginia Grey as Laura Brock
Kim Spalding as Matt Denton (credited as "Ross Latimer")
William Haade as Bill Devlin
Monte Blue as Pete Coleman
Sid Melton as Connore
Rory Mallinson as Editor Larkin
John Brown as Fairweather
Margaret Seddon as Mrs. Denton
House Peters Jr. as Dick Cable
Joel Newfield as George Denton
Anthony Jochim as Farmer
Milton Kibbee as Cashier

References

External links
 

1951 films
American black-and-white films
1950s English-language films
American crime films
American Western (genre) films
Films scored by Albert Glasser
Films set in California
1951 Western (genre) films
Lippert Pictures films
Films directed by Sam Newfield
Revisionist Western (genre) films
1950s American films